Maze procedure may refer to:
 Cox maze procedure, a type of cardiac surgery for atrial fibrillation
 Minimaze procedure, cardiac surgery procedures for atrial fibrillation (AF) derived from the original maze procedure